Elizabeth Sackville, Duchess of Dorset (c. 1689 – 12 June 1768), formerly Elizabeth Colyear, was a British court official and noble, the wife of Lionel Sackville, 1st Duke of Dorset.

She was the daughter of Lieutenant-General Walter Colyear (who was a brother of the Earl of Portmore). In 1703, at the age of fourteen, Elizabeth came to court as a Maid of honour to Queen Anne, a position she inherited from her aunt Catherine Sedley, Countess of Dorchester.

They were married in January 1709, but the marriage was not made public until the duchess became pregnant. The couple had five children in all:

Charles, Earl of Middlesex (later 2nd Duke of Dorset; 1711–1769)
Lord John Sackville (father of the 3rd Duke)
Lord George Sackville (later Lord George Germain and 1st Viscount Sackville)
Elizabeth (died 19 June 1729), who married Thomas Thynne, 2nd Viscount Weymouth
Caroline, who married Joseph Damer, 1st Earl of Dorchester.

Between 1714 and 1737 She was a Lady of the Bedchamber and to Caroline of Ansbach, wife of King George II of the United Kingdom. From 1723 to 1731 she was Caroline's Mistress of the Robes, a title that can be held by no one of lower rank than a duchess. The arrangements for Caroline's appearance at her coronation in 1727 were, however, made by an experienced subordinate.

References

1768 deaths
British duchesses by marriage
Ladies of the Bedchamber
Mistresses of the Robes
British maids of honour
18th-century English women
18th-century English nobility
Elizabeth
Year of birth uncertain
Household of Caroline of Brandenburg-Ansbach